Franco Marvulli (born 11 November 1978 in Zürich) is a Swiss professional racing cyclist.

Palmares

2000
 3rd, National U23 Time Trial Championship
2001
  European Omnium Champion
 1st, Six-Days of Grenoble (with Alexander Äschbach)
 2nd, National Pursuit Championship
2002
  World Scratch Champion
  European Omnium Champion
 2nd, National Points Race Championship
2003
  World Madison Champion (with Bruno Risi)
  World Scratch Champion
  European Omnium Champion
  Team Pursuit Champion (with Aeschbach/Dunkel/Kammermann)
  Elimination Champion
  Pursuit Champion
 1st, Six-Days of Grenoble & Moscou (with Alexander Äschbach)
 1st, Oberriet
 1st, Trois Jours d'Aigle (with Grégory Devaud)
 2nd, National Scratch & Points Race Championship
2004
  European Madison Champion (with Alexander Äschbach)
 1st, Six-Days of Grenoble (with Alexander Äschbach)
 1st, Seis Horas de Euskadi (with Marco Villa)
 1st, Stage 5, Vuelta a El Salvador
 1st, Km del Corso Mestre
 , World Madison Championship (with Bruno Risi)
 , Olympic Games, Madison (with Bruno Risi)
2005
 1st, Six-Days of Stuttgart (with Bruno Risi & Kurt Betschart)
 1st, Prologue & Stages 2 (TTT), 5 & 6, Vuelta a El Salvador
 1st, Horgen
 1st, Km del Corso Mestre
 1st, Cape Argus Sanlam Cycle Tour
2006
  European Madison Champion (with Bruno Risi)
  Madison Champion (with Bruno Risi)
 1st, Six-Days of Mexico (with Luis Fernando Macias)
 1st, Six-Days of Fiorenzuola d' Arda (with Marco Villa)
 1st, Six Days of Maastricht (with Bruno Risi)
 1st, Six-Days of Grenoble (with Alexander Äschbach)
2007
  World Madison Champion (with Bruno Risi)
  Madison Champion (with Bruno Risi)
 1st, Six-Days of Stuttgart (with Bruno Risi & Alexander Äschbach)
 1st, Six-Days' of Zurich, København, Hasselt, Fiorenzuola d'Arda, Dortmund, München & Zuidlaren (with Risi)
 1st, Trois Jours d'Aigle (with Dominique Stark)
2008
 1st, Six-Days of Zurich, Berlin, København & Hasselt (with Bruno Risi)

External links
 

1978 births
Living people
Swiss male cyclists
Cyclists at the 2000 Summer Olympics
Cyclists at the 2004 Summer Olympics
Cyclists at the 2008 Summer Olympics
Olympic cyclists of Switzerland
Olympic silver medalists for Switzerland
Olympic medalists in cycling
Cyclists from Zürich
Medalists at the 2004 Summer Olympics
UCI Track Cycling World Champions (men)
Swiss track cyclists